Sachin Kumar (born 25 December 1997) is an Indian cricketer. He made his List A debut on 25 September 2019, for Bihar in the 2019–20 Vijay Hazare Trophy. He made his Twenty20 debut on 11 January 2021, for Bihar in the 2020–21 Syed Mushtaq Ali Trophy. He made his first-class debut on 17 February 2022, for Bihar in the 2021–22 Ranji Trophy.

References

External links
 

1997 births
Living people
Indian cricketers
Bihar cricketers
Place of birth missing (living people)
21st-century Indian people